Dehsar is a village in Baz Kia Gurab Rural District, in the Central District of Lahijan County, Gilan Province, Iran. At the 2006 census, its population was 432, in 127 families. The village is surrounded by rice fields which is the main job of most people who live here.

References 

Populated places in Lahijan County